The 2015 World Ports Classic was the fourth and final edition of the World Ports Classic cycle stage race. It was part of the 2015 UCI Europe Tour as a 2.1 event. As the previous editions, it consisted of two stages: the first one from Rotterdam to Antwerp was won by 's Andrea Guardini, and the second one, from Antwerp to Rotterdam, by Kris Boeckmans. Boeckmans also won the general classification, as well as the points classification. Rudy Barbier of team  won the young rider classification, and Boeckmans'  team won the teams classification.

Schedule

Teams
18 teams were selected to take place in the 2015 World Ports Classic. Four of these were UCI WorldTeams, ten were UCI Professional Continental teams, and four were UCI Continental teams.

Stages

Stage 1
23 May 2015 — Rotterdam to Antwerp,

Stage 2
24 May 2015 — Antwerp to Rotterdam,

Classification leadership table

Final standings

General classification

Points classification

Young rider classification

Teams classification

References

2015
2015 UCI Europe Tour
2015 in Belgian sport
2015 in Dutch sport